Carlos Antonio Santos-Viola  (born Carlos Santos-Viola y Antonio; April 8, 1912 – July 31, 1994) was an architect in the Philippines. He is best known for designing and building churches for the Iglesia ni Cristo (INC) religious group.

Carlos was born in San Miguel, Bulacan and one of six children to Melecio de Guzman Santos and Miguela Magpitang Antonio.

Starting from San Miguel Elementary School, Carlos moved on to the Ateneo de Manila to finish his high school education. While in Ateneo he joined the school band, and was quite active in basketball. Santos-Viola was one of the first graduates of the College of Architecture of the University of Santo Tomas in 1935. During this time the professors then were outstanding architects and engineers of the period, such as Tomas Arguelles, Tomas Mapua, Juan F. Nakpil, Fernando H. Ocampo, and Andres Luna de San Pedro.

Santos-Viola worked in the office of Juan Nakpil after graduating. There he met Juan's youngest sister, Caridad, his future wife and mother to his children: Rosario, Milagros, Paz, Lourdes and Carlos, Jr.

Shortly after World War II, he decided to open his own office in partnership with Alfredo J. Luz. In 1955, both parted ways and practiced separately.

His first exposure to the INC group was executed under Nakpil's company through the Bishop's Palace in San Juan, Metro Manila. INC gave the subsequent project directly to Santos-Viola. Although common elements may be visible, his designs were distinct from one another. Each structure was created on functionality that was built with integrity, adorned with 20th-century geometric forms garnished with Gothic revival and Baroque lines. Among those completed designs was the INC's central office in Quezon City. Architect Santos-Viola was the only Filipino Architect who designed churches that were built all over the Philippines.

Carlos was a lifelong devout Catholic. He ministered for the Our Lady of Lourdes Church in Quezon City and was frequently invited to join the INC but repeatedly denied the invitations due to ideological differences. He also taught architecture at the college where he graduated, and helped found the Philippine Institute of Architects in 1938.

Gallery

External links
 Biographical Site

1912 births
1994 deaths
Ateneo de Manila University alumni
Tagalog people
Filipino Roman Catholics
Iglesia ni Cristo
People from San Miguel, Bulacan
People from Manila
University of Santo Tomas alumni
20th-century Filipino architects